Partur is a town with municipal council in Jalna district in the Indian state of Maharashtra.

Geography
It has an average elevation of 439 metres (1440 feet). Godavari is major river flows through various villages of Partur. Near Dudhana river Upper Dudhana Dam. Bageshvari Sugar Factory, Warfal in Partur. The main source of income is Agriculture. Most of the people in this area are Farmers. Major Crop is Cotton, Arhar, Sorghum, Wheat, Sugar Cane.

Demographics
 India census, Partur Municipal Council has population of 35,883 of which 18,401 are males while 17,482 are females.

Literacy rate of Partur city is 79.52% lower than Maharashtra state average of 82.34%. In Partur, Male literacy is around 86.03% while female literacy rate is 72.72%.

In Partur, 14.13% of the population is under 6 years of age. Partur has Female Sex Ratio is of 950 higher than state average of 929.

Schedule Caste (SC) constitutes 10.57% while Schedule Tribe (ST) were 3.77% of total population in Partur.

Transportation

Rail
Partur railway station(Code: PTU) is located on the Kacheguda-Manmad line under Nanded Division of South Central Railway (SCR) jurisdiction. Partur is well connected through rail with Mumbai, Nashik, Pune, Aurangabad, Hyderabad, Nanded, Nagpur, Manmad, Latur, Parbhani, Parli Vaijnath, Osmanabad, Mudkhed, Adilabad, Basar, Nizamabad, Daund etc. Ajanta Express between Secunderabad and Manmad is the most prestigious train passing through this station. The Nanded (NED)-Amritsar Sachkhand Express and Madurai-Manmad Express (now Rameswaram-Okha Exp) do not have stop at Partur.
the revenue collection of partur railway station is highest among the taluka/tehsil level railway stations on manmad secandarabad railway line.

Road
Partur is well connected to Pune, Aurangabad, Akola, Nanded, Latur, Hyderabad through state road transport. Partur depot of state transport corporation was the most profitable in the year 2010
And also partur now connected a NH548C

Air
The nearest airports are Chikalthana Airport located at Aurangabad Airport (120 km) and Nanded Airport (145 km).

Education
Jawahar Navodaya Vidyalaya known as JNVs are a system of alternate schools for gifted students in India is situated in Partur.

Several other schools are listed below:

Marathi & Semi English Medium School
Lal Bahadur Shastri High School.
Swami Vivekanand High School.
Zila Parishad High School.
Yoganand high School.
Lalbahadur Shastri Kanya High School.
Adarsh primary School

Urdu Medium School
Maulana Mohammad Ali Johar Urdu Primary School.
Abdul Wahed Bapu Deshmukh High School (Warphal 5 km away from Partur) 
Al-Huda Urdu School.
Dr. Zakir Hussain High School
Dr. Zakir Hussain Primary School

English Medium School
Vivekananda English School & Public School
Swami Vivekanand Primary School
Bright Star English Primary & High School
Maharana Primary School
Universal peace English school
New Era international English School
Dnyanlata Public School

Colleges
Shivraj Arts, Commerce and Science College Partur (Dr. Babasaheb Ambedkar Marathwada University,Aurangabad)
Lal Bahadur Shastri Arts, Commerce and Science jr. College. (State Board )
Lal Bahadur Shastri Arts, Commerce and Science Sr. College. (Dr. Babasaheb Ambedkar Marathwada University,Aurangabad)
Bhanudasrao Chavan Arts, Commerce and Science College.(Dr. Babasaheb Ambedkar Marathwada University,Aurangabad)
Sharda Nursing College Partur
Yoganand jr. college. (Dr. Babasaheb Ambedkar Marathwada University,Aurangabad)
Dr. Zakir Hussain Junior College
Rajkunwar Jr College Partur (State Board )

Banks
Partur is the important financial hub in Jalna district. State Bank of India is one of the oldest Nationalised bank in City. Many other Banks provides financial services to farmers, businessmen and the residents of the town.

List of the banks in Partur is as follows 
 State Bank of India
 Bank of Maharashtra
 Canara Bank
 Maharashtra Gramin Bank
 Sangali Urban Co-Operative Bank Ltd.
 Dinadayal Nagri Sahakari Bank Ltd.
 Axis Bank Limited
 ICICI Bank
 The Jalna District Central Cooperative Bank Ltd. Piartur 
There are 5-6 ATMs, operating in the city.

Multistate
 Vijaya Urban Multistate Co-operative Credit Society Ltd, Majalgoan
Dnyanradha Multistate Co.Opp.Credit Society,Beed
Shubh Kalyan MultiState Co-Op Credit Society Ltd, Havargoan
Shri Padmavati Mata Multistate Co-Op Credit Society Ltd, Rahuri
Rajarshi Shahu Maharaj Multistate Urban Credit Co-Operative Society Ltd, Majalgaon
Icici bank which is leading private sector Bank provides all type of loan to its customers

References

Cities and towns in Jalna district
Talukas in Maharashtra